Bisley is a village and former civil parish, now in the parish of Bisley-with-Lypiatt, in the Stroud district, in Gloucestershire, England, about  east of Stroud. The once-extensive manor included Stroud and Chalford, Thrupp, Oakridge, Bussage, Througham and Eastcombe. In 1891 the parish had a population of 5171.

Governance
An electoral ward in the name Bisley exists. The ward has the same area and population as the civil parish of "Bisley-with-Lypiatt". 

The parish was abolished in 1894 to form "Bisley with Lypiatt" and Chalford.

History and architecture
The area is noted for the wealth of its Cotswold stone houses of architectural and historic interest. They include Lypiatt Park, formerly the home of Judge H. B. D. Woodcock and then of the late Modernist sculptor Lynn Chadwick; Nether Lypiatt Manor, formerly the home of Violet Gordon-Woodhouse and Prince and Princess Michael of Kent; Daneway (near Sapperton, but within the parish of Bisley); Over Court; Througham Court (repaired in 1929 for the novelist Sir Michael Sadleir by Norman Jewson); and Jaynes Court, formerly the private residence of Simon Isaacs, 4th Marquess of Reading (born 1942).

Througham Slad Manor is believed to date from the mid-16th century with 18th century additions, the manor was altered in the 1930s by Norman Jewson for W. A. Cadbury. In the 1970s, the house was owned by Mike Oldfield, who installed a recording studio in the barn.

The village prison, which had originally been located in the churchyard, was replaced in 1824 by a two-cell lock-up, where drunks were kept overnight, and petty criminals were detained before appearing before the magistrate. This was often followed by a spell in the stocks or pillory. This building still stands, minus its heavy oak doors.

Bisley has a structure on Wells Road, containing seven spouts forming a public water supply from the Seven Springs and is known for its well dressing.

There is a Saxon wayside cross on the wide verge of Bisley Road, south-west of Stancombe Toll House.

Church history

The parish church of All Saints may originally have been an Anglo-Saxon minster. Between 1827 and 1857 the Vicar was Thomas Keble, a Tractarian and a pioneer in parish ministry. Thomas Keble was the younger brother of John Keble. His son Thomas Keble succeeded him as Vicar.

Notable residents
Denis Parsons Burkitt, surgeon and cancer researcher, lived latterly in Bisley and was buried there in 1993.
Mike Oldfield, musician, lived and recorded at Througham Slad Manor in the 1970s.
Bisley since 1982 has been the home of Jilly Cooper, a prolific contemporary novelist, and was that of her husband, the publisher Leo Cooper, until his death in 2013.
Michael Sadleir (1888–1957), publisher, novelist, book collector and bibliographer, lived in Bisley from 1929 to 1949.

Gallery

See also
Bisley Boy

References

External links

http://www.bisleyvillage.com/
http://www.bisleynews.co.uk
BBC archive film of Bisley from 1985
Stroud Voices (Bisley filter) - oral history site

Villages in Gloucestershire
Former civil parishes in Gloucestershire
Stroud District